The Roman Catholic Diocese of Purnea is a diocese located in the city of Purnea in the Ecclesiastical province of Patna in India.

History
 27 June 1998: Established as Diocese of Purnea from the Diocese of Dumka

Bishops
 Vincent Barwa (27 June 1998 – 29 September 2004)
 Angelus Kujur (20 January 2007 – 8 December 2021)

References

External links
 GCatholic.org 
 Catholic Hierarchy 

Roman Catholic dioceses in India
Christian organizations established in 1998
Roman Catholic dioceses and prelatures established in the 20th century
Christianity in Bihar
1998 establishments in Bihar
Purnia